Mawanda Sebanakitta was Kabaka (King) of the Kingdom of Buganda, between 1738 and 1740. He was the twenty second (22nd) Kabaka of Buganda.

Claim to the throne
He was the third son of Kabaka Ndawula Nsobya, the 19th Kabaka of Buganda. His mother was Nakidde Luyiga of the Ngo clan, the fourth (4th) of his father's seven (7) wives. Mawanda killed his brother Kabaka Kikulwe Mawuba and seized the throne around 1738. He established his capital at Katakala.

Married life
He is recorded to have married seven (7) wives:

 Naabakyaala Kikome, the Kaddulubaale, daughter of Gabunga, of the Mamba clan
 Naabakyaala Nabunnya Nassaza, daughter of Masembe, of the Nsenene clan
 Nabuuso, daughter of Gunju, of the Butiko clan.
 Nakasinde, daughter of Namwaama, of the Kkobe clan
 Namisango, daughter of Sebugwaawo, of the Musu clan
 Nang'onzi, daughter of Mbaziira, of the Nnyonyi clan
 Nankonyo, daughter of Kagenda, of the Mamba clan

Issue
His children included the following:

 Prince (Omulangira) Mulere, whose mother was Nabunnya. He rebelled against Kabaka Kyabaggu but was defeated and captured. He was killed by being burned alive at Buyinja.
 Prince (Omulangira) Bbengo, whose mother was Kikome. He rebelled against Kabaka Kyabaggu but was defeated and captured. He was killed by being burned alive at Bbuye.
 Prince (Omulangira) Waswa, whose mother was Nakasinde. He was a twin with Nakato.
 Prince (Omulangira) Kirabe, whose mother was Nang'onzi.
 Princess (Omumbejja) Nakato, whose mother was Nakasinde. She was a twin with Waswa.
 Princess (Omumbejja) Namirembe, whose mother was Nankonyo.

The final years
A group of princes in the royal court conspired to murder Kabaka Mawanda in 1740. The group included Prince Mwanga Sebanakitta, who ascended the throne after Kabaka Mawanda's demise. Kabaka Mawanda was buried at Meerera at first, but was exhumed in 1864 and re-buried at Serinnya.

Quotes
"Mawanda had qualities which endeared him to the people. He was brave and fearless."
 MM Semakula Kiwanuka, A History of Buganda, 1971

"Kabaka Mawanda (1730-60) had consolidated the monarchy as the overriding centre of power in Buganda through the administrative reforms he carried out, creating a parallel system of administration, the Bitongole whose officials were directly responsible to the Kabaka and reached down to villages."
 Samwiri Lwanga-Lunyiigo, Mwanga II, 2011

Succession table

See also
 Kabaka of Buganda

References

External links
List of the Kings of Buganda

Kabakas of Buganda
18th-century monarchs in Africa